Yes Bank  is an Indian bank headquartered in Mumbai, India and was founded by Rana Kapoor and Ashok Kapoor in 2004.

History 
The history of Yes Bank can be traced back to 1999, when three Indian bankers decided to launch a non-banking financial enterprise together. They were Ashok Kapur, who had previously worked as the national head for the ABN Amro Bank, Harkirat Singh, who had previously worked as the country head for the Deutsche Bank, and Rana Kapoor, who had previously worked as the head of corporate finance for the ANZ Grindlays Bank. The Rabobank in the Netherlands held the remaining 75% of the shares in the non-banking financial business. The three Indian promoters each owned 25% of the company. In 2003, it was rebranded as the Yes Bank. It was also the same year that Harkirat Singh resigned due to concerns over the influence exercised by Rabobank in the hiring of CEO and executive chairman positions.

Yes Bank has been unable to raise capital over the past few years, which has led to a steady deterioration in its financial position. This has resulted in potential loan losses, which in turn led to downgrades, which prompted investors to invoke bond covenants, and a withdrawal of deposits by customers. Over the course of the previous four quarters, the bank racked up losses and very little income. Rana Kapoor was fired as a result, and he was arrested in connection with a INR 466 crore money laundering case.

The bank's management, under the new leadership of Kumar, immediately repositioned itself and dealt with all internal and market related challenges to restore customer and depositor confidence. Under the coordinated efforts of the new board and management, Mehta assured shareholders of a speedy recovery, even as the Reserve Bank of India (RBI), State Bank of India (SBI), HDFC Bank, ICICI Bank, Axis Bank and other banks lent it support through the historic Yes Bank Reconstruction Scheme 2020.

In July 2020, Yes Bank Ltd closed their follow-on public offer (FPO) with 95% subscription, driven by institutional investors.

As of 28 July 2020, Yes Bank is an associate of State Bank of India which has a 30% stake in the company.

On 21 February 2023, Yes Bank issued 2,13,650 equity shares to its employees under the company ESOP plan.

Shareholding 
As of March 2018, as per its annual shareholders' report, the three largest shareholders of Yes Bank Ltd. were foreign portfolio investors (43%), insurance companies (14%), and Mutual Funds including UTI (10%).

Smaller (less than 5%) shareholdings were owned by its three promoters [Rana Kapoor (4%), Yes Capital (India) Pvt. Ltd. (3%), and Morgan Credits Pvt. Ltd. (3%)] and other investors including Madhu Kapur (8%), Mags Finvest Pvt. Ltd. (2%), and LIC India under its various schemes (10%).

In March 2020, State Bank of India invested  in Yes Bank amid a financial crisis and holds 30% stake in the company as of 28 July 2020.

Operations
Yes Bank operates in Retail, MSME and Corporate banking sectors. It offers wide range of differentiated products for corporate and retail customers through retail banking and asset management services. On 5 March 2020, in an attempt to avoid the collapse of the bank, which had an excessive amount of bad loans, the Reserve Bank of India (RBI) took control of it. RBI later reconstructed the board and named Prashant Kumar, former chief financial officer and deputy managing director of State Bank of India, as MD & CEO of Yes Bank, along with Sunil Mehta, former non-executive chairman of Punjab National Bank, as Yes Bank's non-executive chairman.

In October 2017, the bank launched a digital wallet known as Yes Pay, integrating with BHIM and UPI. On 3 November 2017, Yes Bank signed a MoU with the government to provide  financing for food processing projects.

As of September 2018, Yes Bank had taken syndicated loans from eight large international entities including ADB, OPIC, European investment bank, banks in Taiwan and Japan for amounts ranging from US$30 million to US$410 million.

It also partnered with the US government-based OPIC and with Wells Fargo to support women entrepreneurs.

Yes Bank provides (UPI) Unified Payments Interface facility to allow customers to easily and securely perform various financial transactions from their mobile devices via third-party app providers like PhonePe and Yuva Pay.

According to the data shared by NPCI (National Payments Corporation of India), Yes Bank processed 25.94 million transactions amounting to INR 14811.73 crores through its own UPI app in July 2021.

Yes Bank acquired over 24.19% stake in Dish TV, India's largest direct-to-home (DTH) company in terms of subscribers, on 30 May 2020.

Subsidiaries 
It has three subsidiaries – YES Securities (India) Limited, YES Trustee Limited and YES Asset Management (India) Limited.

Moratorium 
On 5 March 2020, the Reserve Bank of India (RBI) announced that, in the interest of its customers and depositors, it would suspend and supersede Yes Bank's board and impose a 30-day moratorium on its operations. The RBI cited Yes Bank's failures to raise new funding to cover its non-performing assets, inaccurate statements of confidence in its ability to receive new funding, and its underreporting of its non-performing assets, among other factors, as the reasons for the moratorium.

RBI governor Shaktikanta Das stated that the matter would be resolved swiftly; Finance Minister, Nirmala Sitharaman announced a proposed turnaround plan under which the State Bank of India would take a 49% stake in Yes Bank and introduce a new board.

The moratorium disrupted multiple e-commerce services whose users were struggling to make online transactions or use popular payment services like UPI.

Almost two weeks later (12 days), the bank came out of the moratorium and resumed full-fledged banking operations from 18 March 2020. This came after a consortium of eight public and private banks, led by State Bank of India, agreed to infuse capital into Yes Bank. And barely nine months after the imposition of the moratorium, Yes Bank was on the road to recovery. The bank's operating profits and recoveries were sufficient to provide for credit costs and it would not need to consume capital for further operations.

On 13 March 2020, the Union Cabinet approved the reconstruction scheme for Yes Bank, stating that within three days of the notification of the scheme, the moratorium would be lifted. During this reconstruction, seven investors infused  in Yes bank and Prashant Kumar was proposed as new CEO of the bank. These investors include State Bank of India, ICICI Bank, HDFC Bank, Axis Bank, Kotak Mahindra Bank, Rakesh Jhunjhunwala, Radhakishan Damani and Azim Premji trust.

On 6 March 2020, ICRA downgraded the rating of Yes Bank's  in core bonds to a "D" rating, while Moody's downgraded them to "Caa3". On 8 March 2020, Yes Bank founder Rana Kapoor was arrested by the Enforcement Directorate under charges of money laundering.

In May 2021, the Securities Appellate Tribunal (SAT) imposed an interim stay on SEBI's order.

Listings
Yes Bank has equities listed on the Bombay Stock Exchange and the National Stock Exchange of India and bonds listed on the London stock exchange.

Reconstruction
Under the new management, Yes Bank has managed to overhaul its risk and governance frameworks while saving itself from reputational risks. The liquidity profile of the bank is well above the required regulatory norms.

In June 2021, the board approved INR 10,000 crore worth of fundraising by issuance of debt securities.

In financial year 2020–21, Yes Bank saw a marked rise in deposits at 55% and operating profits at 42% year on year. The recapitalization drive at the bank generated ₹15,000 crore via follow-on public offers in July 2020. Yes Bank continues to focus on digital payments, concentrating on its market share in UPI and IMPS transactions while it plans to disburse ₹10,000 crore in retail and MSME loans in Q3 of FY21.

In September 2016, Yes Bank scrapped its proposed $1 billion share sale due to market conditions. The company subsequently attempted to relaunch its failed capital raising exercise after appointing a new set of bankers.

Ratings Upgrade
In September 2020, ICRA upgraded its ratings on securities issued by Yes Bank Ltd, factoring in various positive developments in the bank's financial profile. Infrastructure bonds and Basel II compliant lower tier II bonds were raised to ‘BBB’ from ‘BB+’. Basel III compliant tier II bonds were upgraded to ‘BBB-’ from ‘BB’. Basel II compliant tier I bonds and upper tier II bonds were upgraded to ‘BB’ from a default rating previously.

In August 2020, Moody's too had raised Yes Bank's long term issuer rating by a notch to B3 from Caa1. In November 2020, CARE Ratings revised its rating on the YES Bank's infrastructure bonds to 'CARE BBB' from the previous 'CARE B'. It also revised its outlook to 'Stable' from the previous ‘Under credit watch with developing implications’ on the above-mentioned instruments. Yes Bank's Upper Tier II Bonds and Perpetual Bonds (Basel II) received a revised rating of 'CARE BB+' from previous 'CARE D'.

See also

 Banking in India
 List of banks in India
 Reserve Bank of India
 Indian Financial System Code
 List of largest banks
 List of companies of India
 Make in India

References

External links
 Official Website

Banks based in Mumbai
Banks established in 2003
2005 initial public offerings
Yes Bank
Companies listed on the National Stock Exchange of India
Companies listed on the Bombay Stock Exchange